William Henley (1874–1957) was an English violinist, arranger of music, music teacher, and composer. Henley studied with August Wilhelmj and later became a professor of composition and principal of the violin at the Royal Academy of Music in London. 

The seminal reference book the Universal Dictionary of Violin & Bow Makers is based on his notes.  The book was the first to include a significant number of American craftsmen.  Henley travelled extensively as a performer, primarily with his quartet.  It was during his trips, including a trip to America during the 1920s, that he gathered information for his book.

External links

References

1874 births
1957 deaths
English violinists
British male violinists